Čvarci (singular čvarak, Belarusian: шкваркі, romanized: škvarki) is a specialty popular in Southeastern Europe, a variant of pork rinds. They are a kind of pork cracklings, with fat thermally extracted from the lard.

Čvarci are mostly a rustic countryside specialty, common to the cuisines of Serbia, Bosnia, continental Croatia, Slovenia,  Romania, and North Macedonia. They can also be found in other countries throughout Central and Eastern Europe: in Poland, Czech Republic, Slovakia, Austria, Hungary, Ukraine and Belarus. They are usually homemade, with industrial production not as pronounced. In larger cities they can be obtained on farmer markets or in supermarkets.

Preparation 
Preparation of čvarci involves melting the lard. Lard is cut in blocks of about one inch (2.54 cm) in size and slowly fried in their own fat. Milk may be added at this point in order to obtain caramel colour. Process lasts until all fat melts away and only a kind of tough crispy pork rind remains. Onion or garlic may be added as a spice and salt is always used as a condiment. Pieces of skin may or may not be attached. In most common varieties of čvarci, some percentage of pork fat remains.

Duvan čvarci 

A special variety of čvarci known as duvan čvarci are mostly produced in the Western Serbia region and especially around the town of Valjevo. In case of duvan čvarci, the process of slow fat frying/cooking is prolonged until all the fat has been extracted. The remainder is a mass of delicate fibers which resembles finely chopped tobacco, thus giving the name to the variety: duvan is a Serbian word for tobacco. Indications for duvan čvarci had been registered and protected in the Serbian intellectual property office by Slavoljub Batoćanin.

A similar process is used to the same effect in Hrvatsko Zagorje, where čvarci are pressed in a potato press to achieve faster fat extraction.

Consumption 

As with most traditional pork products, they are considered to be winter food. Traditional time for pork processing in the Balkans is late autumn, and čvarci are consumed throughout the winter. They can be eaten on their own as a snack, served with heated fruit brandy common to the same region, called rakija, or they can be used as an ingredient in other food recipes (such as proja baked with čvarci). In Croatia, they are most often eaten with bread and onions. If consumed as a snack, they are very often combined with beer.

Recipes with čvarci include various sorts of pastry.

See also
 Chicharrón
 Gribenes
 Pig slaughter
 Pork rind
 Rousong

References

Austrian cuisine
Croatian cuisine
Czech cuisine
Hungarian cuisine
Polish cuisine
Romanian cuisine
Serbian cuisine
Slovak cuisine
Slovenian cuisine
Ukrainian cuisine
Slavic cuisine
Bacon dishes
Serbian products with protected designation of origin

cs:Škvarky
hr:Čvarci
it:Ciccioli
sl:Ocvirki